Custer Observatory is an astronomical observatory owned and operated by Custer Institute.
Located in Southold, New York (US), facing Peconic Bay and Shelter Island, Custer's location has some of the darkest skies on Long Island.

Long Island's oldest public observatory, Custer Institute was founded in 1927 by Charles Wesley Elmer  (co-founder of the Perkin-Elmer Optical Company), along with a group of fellow amateur astronomers.  The name was adopted to honor the hospitality of Mrs. Elmer, the Grand Niece of General George Armstrong Custer.
In 1942, the Custer Institute was incorporated as a non-profit educational corporation in the State of New York.

In 1938, the group purchased the land the institute presently occupies. Initial construction was completed in the spring of 1939.  A 100-seat lecture hall was added in 1945.  In 1947, through donations by Charles Elmer and Mr. Polk, a three story tower/library and observatory dome were built.
In 1954, Charles Elmer died; that same year, the Institute added a shed, which houses three sliding roof observatories.

Over the years, Custer has acquired a large collection of telescopes of all sizes and descriptions. Most recently, Custer acquired a 10" Zerochromat refracting telescope. Custer's Zerochromat telescope is the largest of its type in the United States. This telescope is in the main observatory dome.

Custer's 10” refracting telescope was manufactured in England by Zerochromat Telescopes. Designed by optician Peter Wise, the telescope's dialyte lenses make it apochromatic, providing enhanced views of solar system and deep space objects. The folded light path construction uses mirrors to reduce the telescope's size, allowing the long f/12 focal length telescope to fit in Custer's dome.

The telescope is attached to a computer-controlled Fornax 152 equatorial mount, permitting easy aiming and object tracking. The entire assembly can be raised/lowered on the Pier-Tech pier to accommodate most users’ heights, for comfortable viewing.

Previously, the dome was home to a 25-inch (f/5) Obsession Newtonian reflector.  In order to bring the eyepiece of this telescope to a level that does not require observers to climb a high ladder, the optics on this telescope were modified solely by Justine Haupt, an engineer at Brookhaven National Lab. Justine Haupt is currently involved in working on the camera for the Vera C. Rubin Observatory.

Custer Library
The Custer Library contains a wealth of Astronomy and Science books dating from the 19th century to the present. It also houses the Institute's videotape collection and 35mm astronomical slide collection. It contains National Geographic, Sky & Telescope, Astronomy, and Scientific American magazines dating back numerous decades. Membership to the Custer Institute grants access to their library.

Custer Exhibit Room
The Custer Institute Exhibit Room contains the following in its collection:

 Henry Fitz, early Custer member and famous telescope mirror maker's Grinding Table. (This table is similar to the one on display at the Smithsonian in Washington, DC.)
 James Short's circa 1750 Gregorian telescope variation designed to read the separation of binary stars. One of only three known to exist.
 Various 18th and 19th centuries vintage spectrometers and sextants, along with other astronomical devices.
 The Custer Rock Collection including geodes and numerous Fossilized Rocks.
 The Custer Meteorite Collection, which includes a Shergottite from Mars.
 Numerous astronomical, sunspot, and aurora pictures taken by past and present members.
 Wilson - Type Expansion Cloud Chamber
 12-1/4" Speculum metal mirror.
 The Custer Civil War Bullet Collection.
 A piece of a tree that was originally planted at Bronx College by Albert Einstein (who often summered in Jamesport).

Telescopes
Custer has a large collection of telescopes of all sizes and description. Among them are:

 25" Obsession Newtonian reflector (on loan from Suffolk Community College)
 20" Obsession Newtonian reflector (on loan from Tom Pennino)
 14" Celestron CGE-1400 Go-To Schmidt-Cassegrain (South Bay, Shed)
 14" Meade LX200GPS-SMT
 13" Newtonian dobsonian
 12½" Newtonian reflector
 12" Springfield designed by Russell Porter.
 10½" Newtonian reflector ('Blue Odyssey Dob in the Dome')
 10" Astro-binoculars, designed and built by one of the observatory members, Rico Verticchio, and on permanent loan to Custer.
 9 ¼” Celestron CGE Go-To Schmidt-Cassegrain
 8" Cave Astrola Cassegrain.
 7" f/20 refractor
 6" Ceravolo Maksutov Newtonian
 6" f/10 Eichner refractor
 6" Alvan Clark refractor
 5" Alvan Clark student model refractor
 5" Fitz refractor
 4½" James Short Gregorian Reflector (mid-18th century)
 4" Unitron refractor, f/14.7
 3.5" Bausch & Lomb refractor, f/13.7
 80mm Jaegers refractor, f/15.4
 2.4" brass refractor
 7x21 Ross Camera, f/7 with a 3" lens, accepting 8x10 and 4x5 inch plate film.
 8" SCT f/11 Canon TV Lens (mirror-lens design, converted for use as a telescope)
 8" SCT f/5.6 mirror-lens (attaches to TV studio camera)

Images

See also
List of observatories

References

External links
 Custer Observatory Website
 Custer Institute Clear Sky Clock Forecasts of observing conditions.

Southold, New York
Astronomical observatories in New York (state)
Public observatories
Infrastructure completed in 1947